In New Zealand, Dove River may refer to

 Dove River (Canterbury) in the Hurunui catchment
 Dove River (Tasman) a tributary of the Motueka River

See also
 Dove River (disambiguation) for rivers in other countries